Wenatchee High School is a public school in Wenatchee, Washington, United  States. It serves grades 9-12 for the Wenatchee School District.

Notable alumni 

 Trey Adams, football player
 Mackenzie Cowell, murder victim
 Duane Francies, military aviator
 Jakob Kasimir Hellrigl (Candy Ken), rapper and model
 Cody O'Connell, football player
 Al Worley, football player

References

External links
Wenatchee H.S.
Wenatchee School District #246

Public high schools in Washington (state)
Education in Wenatchee, Washington
Schools in Chelan County, Washington
Buildings and structures in Wenatchee, Washington